The Lateran Treaty was one component of the Lateran Pacts of 1929, agreements between the Kingdom of Italy under King Victor Emmanuel III of Italy and the Holy See under Pope Pius XI to settle the long-standing Roman Question. The treaty and associated pacts were named after the Lateran Palace where they were signed on 11 February 1929, and the Italian parliament ratified them on 7 June 1929. The treaty recognized Vatican City as an independent state under the sovereignty of the Holy See. The Italian government also agreed to give the Roman Catholic Church financial compensation for the loss of the Papal States. In 1948, the Lateran Treaty was recognized in the Constitution of Italy as regulating the relations between the state and the Catholic Church. The treaty was significantly revised in 1984, ending the status of Catholicism as the sole state religion.

Content
The Lateran Pacts are often presented as three treaties: a 27-article treaty of conciliation, a three-article financial convention, and a 45-article concordat. However, the website of the Holy See presents the financial convention as an annex of the treaty of conciliation, considering the pacts as two documents:
 A political treaty recognising the full sovereignty of the Holy See in the State of Vatican City, which was thereby established, accompanied by four annexes:
 A map of the territory of Vatican City State
 Maps of buildings with extraterritorial privilege and exemption from expropriation and taxes (owned by the Holy See but located in Italy and not forming part of Vatican City)
 Maps of buildings with exemption from expropriation and taxes (but without extraterritorial privilege)
 A financial convention agreed on as a definitive settlement of the claims of the Holy See following the loss in 1870 of its territories and property
 A concordat regulating relations between the Catholic Church and the Italian state

History

During the unification of Italy in the mid-19th century, the Papal States resisted incorporation into the new nation, even as all the other Italian countries, except for San Marino, joined it; Camillo Cavour's dream of proclaiming the Kingdom of Italy from the steps of St. Peter's Basilica did not come to pass. The nascent Kingdom of Italy invaded and occupied Romagna (the eastern portion of the Papal States) in 1860, leaving only Latium in the pope's domains. Latium, including Rome itself, was occupied and annexed in 1870. For the following sixty years, relations between the Papacy and the Italian government were hostile, and the status of the pope became known as the "Roman Question".

Negotiations for the settlement of the Roman Question began in 1926 between the government of Italy and the Holy See, and culminated in the agreements of the Lateran Pacts, signed—the Treaty says—for King Victor Emmanuel III of Italy by Prime Minister Benito Mussolini and for Pope Pius XI by Cardinal Secretary of State Pietro Gasparri, on 11 February 1929. It was ratified on 7 June 1929.

The agreements included a political treaty which created the state of the Vatican City and guaranteed full and independent sovereignty to the Holy See. The Pope was pledged to perpetual neutrality in international relations and to abstention from mediation in a controversy unless specifically requested by all parties. In the first article of the treaty, Italy reaffirmed the principle established in the 1848 Constitution of the Kingdom of Italy, that "the Catholic, Apostolic and Roman Religion is the only religion of the State". The attached financial agreement was accepted as settlement of all the claims of the Holy See against Italy arising from the loss of temporal power of the Papal States in 1870.

The sum thereby given to the Holy See was actually less than Italy declared it would pay under the terms of the Law of Guarantees of 1871, by which the Italian government guaranteed to Pope Pius IX and his successors the use of, but not sovereignty over, the Vatican and Lateran Palaces and a yearly income of Lire 3,250,000 as indemnity for the loss of sovereignty and territory. The Holy See, on the grounds of the need for clearly manifested independence from any political power in its exercise of spiritual jurisdiction, had refused to accept the settlement offered in 1871, and the popes thereafter until the signing of the Lateran Treaty considered themselves prisoners in the Vatican, a small, limited area inside Rome.

To commemorate the successful conclusion of the negotiations, Mussolini commissioned the Via della Conciliazione (Road of the Conciliation), which would symbolically link the Vatican City to the heart of Rome.

After 1946 
The Constitution of the Italian Republic, adopted in 1948, states that relations between the State and the Catholic Church "are regulated by the Lateran Treaties".

In 1984, the concordat was significantly revised. Among other things, both sides declared: "The principle of the Catholic religion as the sole religion of the Italian State, originally referred to by the Lateran Pacts, shall be considered to be no longer in force". The Church's position as the sole state-supported religion of Italy was also ended, replacing the state financing with a personal income tax called the otto per mille, to which other religious groups, Christian and non-Christian, also have access. , there are ten other religious groups with access. The revised concordat regulated the conditions under which civil effects are accorded by Italy to church marriages and to ecclesiastical declarations of nullity of marriages. Abolished articles included those concerning state recognition of knighthoods and titles of nobility conferred by the Holy See, the undertaking by the Holy See to confer ecclesiastical honours on those authorized to perform religious functions at the request of the State or the Royal Household, and the obligation of the Holy See to enable the Italian government to present political objections to the proposed appointment of diocesan bishops.

In 2008, it was announced that the Vatican would no longer immediately adopt all Italian laws, citing conflict over right-to-life issues following the trial and ruling of the Eluana Englaro case.

Violations
Italy's anti-Jewish laws of 1938 prohibited marriages between Jews and non-Jews, including Catholics: the Vatican viewed this as a violation of the Concordat, which gave the church the sole right to regulate marriages involving Catholics. Further, Article 34 of the Concordat had also specified that marriages performed by the Catholic Church would always be considered valid by civil authorities:  the Holy See understood this to apply to all marriages in Italy celebrated by Roman Catholic clergy, regardless of the faiths of those being married.

See also
 Concordat
 Law of Guarantees
 List of sovereigns of the Vatican City State
 Index of Vatican City-related articles
 Properties of the Holy See
 Roman Question
 Reichskonkordat, treaty between the Holy See and Nazi Germany
 Religion in Italy

Notes

References

Sources 

 Kertzer, David I. (2004). Prisoner of the Vatican: The Popes' Secret Plot to Capture Rome from the New Italian State (Boston: Houghton Mifflin Company).
 
 Latourette, Kenneth Scott. Christianity in a Revolutionary Age: A History of Christianity in the 19th and 20th Century: Vol. 4 The 20th Century in Europe (1961), pp. 32–35, 153, 156, 371.
 McCormick, Anne O'Hare (1957). Vatican Journal: 1921-1954 (New York: Farrar, Straus and Cudahy)
 Pollard, John F. (2005). The Vatican and Italian Fascism, 1929–32: A Study in Conflict. Cambridge University Press. . 
 Pollard, Jonh F. (2014). The Papacy in the Age of Totalitarianism, 1914–1958. Oxford University Press. .
 
 
 Suzzallo, Henry, Ph.D., Sc.D., LL.D., Editor in Chief, The National Encyclopedia: Volume 10, (New York, P. F. Collier & Son Corporation, 1935)
 

Archival sources

External links

 Text of the Lateran Treaty (English translation)
 Text of the Lateran Pacts, including the financial convention and the concordat (original Italian)
 Italian law executing the Lateran Pacts, with the text and annexed maps (original Italian)

1929 in Italy
Modern history of Italy
Government of Vatican City
Political history of Vatican City
History of Catholicism in Italy
History of Rome
Holy See–Italy relations
Italy–Vatican City border
Pope Pius XI
Treaties entered into force in 1929
Treaties concluded in 1929
Treaties of the Holy See (1870–1929)
Treaties of the Kingdom of Italy (1861–1946)
Law of Vatican City
1929 in Vatican City
1920s in Rome
February 1929 events
Interwar-period treaties
Legal history of Vatican City